Scotty Grainger is a fictional character from the CBS soap opera The Young and the Restless. He was played by actor Blair Redford from July 2005 until January 2006. In January 2017, Soap Opera Digest announced that Daniel Hall had been recast in the role. In January 2018, Hall was written out of the show, he last aired on January 17.

Storylines

1991–94
In 1989, Lauren Fenmore (Tracey E. Bregman) and Dr. Scott Grainger (Peter Barton) got married, but Sheila Carter (Kimberlin Brown) wanted Scott for herself. She drugged him in order to get herself pregnant, and she and Lauren were both pregnant by Scott at the same time. Scott then divorced Lauren out of obligation to Sheila. Then, Sheila miscarried, but she bought a baby off the black market, and she swapped the child with Lauren's newborn son. She "delivered" Scott Grainger Jr. in 1991, and Lauren raised Sheila's black market baby, Dylan, until he died from meningitis at the age of one year in 1992. Soon after, Sheila's mother, Molly Carter (Marilyn Alex), revealed the truth to Lauren and Scott. The couple were reunited with their son, and they got remarried in 1992. Unfortunately, Scott became terminally ill the same year, and he died shortly after. Lauren then moved to Los Angeles, and she took Scotty with her. Over the next few years, Lauren traveled the world. It was revealed during that time that Scotty spent his childhood in boarding school. Lauren returned to Genoa City in 2001 while Scotty was still in school.

2005–06
After her return, Lauren  married Michael Baldwin (Christian LeBlanc) in 2005. Michael soon quizzed Lauren about her rarely mentioned son, Scotty, hopeful that he would attend the wedding, and they could finally meet, but Lauren was evasive. After a failed internet search, Michael's half-brother, Kevin Fisher (Greg Rikaart), called Scotty from Lauren's cell phone, and they traced the boy to Toronto, Ontario, Canada. Michael went to Canada to meet his future stepson, now a 24-year-old college student, working on his master's degree in education with a specialty in creative writing. Scotty, using "Scott" professionally, disclosed that he had never been back to Genoa City since he was a toddler. Still, Lauren visited him often during his stays in boarding school. Scott had always wondered why his mother was so secretive, but he gave up asking a long time ago. Not long after Michael returned to Genoa City, Lauren decided to tell Scott about her impending marriage, but Scott admitted that he had already met Michael. Lauren felt betrayed by Michael, but he later reminded her about how she disliked his family secrets.

After Lauren left Scott's apartment, Sheila Carter walked out of Scott's bedroom. Sheila was taking college courses, and Scott, who looked just like his father, was her tutor. Sheila gave Scott an idea for a novel. Unknown to him, the story was of Sheila and his mother's past, but Sheila made Lauren out to be the evil-doer who stole Sheila's baby when it was really the other way around. Meanwhile, Michael discovered Lauren and Sheila's history, and he visited "Sheila" in a Californian prison for the criminally insane. This woman was not Sheila, but "Sugar" (also played by Kimberlin Brown), who had plastic surgery to look like Sheila. She escaped from prison for two months before turning herself in. Scott came to Genoa City for his mother's wedding and Sheila followed him there in disguise. She soon hooked up with Kevin Fisher's abusive father, "Terrible Tom" Fisher (Roscoe Born).

Not realizing that Shelia was intent on murder, Tom was conned into joining her plot to get back at Lauren by planting a bomb on Lauren and Michael's honeymoon yacht. Lauren was presumed dead, but Tom saved her in time. He kept Lauren and Sheila captive until Lauren convinced him that Sheila was evil. John Abbott (Jerry Douglas) discovered that Lauren was being held hostage, and in his attempt to rescue her, Tom was fatally shot in 2006. Lauren and Sheila worked together to escape from the bomb shelter that they were being held in. Sheila left town after the shelter caved in, and she was severely hurt. Luckily, Lauren came out unscathed, and she reunited with Scott and Michael. Scott decided to stay in Genoa City with his mother, but he soon faded into the background. Several months later in 2006, Lauren revealed that Scott moved back to Toronto.

In 2012, when Daisy Carter, Sheila's daughter, is freed from prison, Lauren feels extremely endangered. She is scared that Daisy will torture her and her family, so she decides to send Fenmore Baldwin, her son with Michael, to live with Scotty until the matter with Daisy is resolved.

2017–18
By 2017 Scott was writing articles for a news service, and was working on a refugee project in a war zone, South Sudan Ukraine Thailand. His mother, Lauren became concerned when she stopped from him, then received a call that was disconnected. Lauren received word that the State Department believed that Scott was missing, although alive and possibly held captive. Scott had left for an interview, but he, nor his driver, had been heard from since. Lauren received another call traced to the Middle East, the caller claiming to be holding Scott captive, and asking for ten million dollars or he would die. Paul advised not to pay and contacted friends at the State Department and Journalists International. Since neither Lauren nor Jill had the money to pay the ransom, Lauren went to Victor Newman who took over, sending Kevin Fisher as courier with the ransom money. Scott was rescued, and Lauren was elated when he arrived in Genoa City. Scott lost his job as the news service realized he was a liability. Scott balked at Lauren's suggestion that he put down roots there. But after Victor used his contacts to help find his missing driver Ahmad, he accepted Victor's offer to co-author his biography under the condition that it be the truth. Scott mentioned that he had worked on a book with Sheila Carter, the woman who had stolen him as a newborn. Lauren set Scott up with the much older Phyllis Summers. They got along famously, got drunk, and were about to have sex but were interrupted by Kevin. Realizing the absurdity of being together with Scott being the son of Phyllis' best friend, Phyllis went back to Billy Abbott, she refused to be interviewed for Victor's bio, and Scott told his mother that hookup had been a terrible idea. Scott began to show an interest in Sharon Newman. Sharon explained that she wasn't ready from a relationship, not being over Dylan, plus she was now managing Crimson Lights and going back to college to get her degree. He said he understood, and they began spending time together. Not long after Sharon received divorce papers, Sharon and Scott ended up making love after she cooked him dinner, next morning he made breakfast and they made love again.

Scott revealed to Sharon that he had once worked to catch an international arms dealer through the dealer's wife. The man had been captured, but Scott had fallen in love with her. Scott got evidence that she had been an innocent victim, but he had to leave her behind to protect her.

Christine Blair and Scott met, and it was revealed that Scott had been working undercover for the justice department. Reminding Christine that when he was captured, they had abandoned him, and Victor had rescued him, not them. Even though his aunt Christine offered to be his contact in the future and tried to lure him into a sex trafficking case in the Midwest, Scott told her they could go to hell. Victor later canceled the book idea, and hired Scott as Sr. Vice President of Special Projects at Newman to keep an eye on Abby. Scott hated the idea of wearing a suit and sitting behind a desk, but felt he owed Victor his life. Under Scott's recommendation, Victor bought a digital media company called Hashtag and put Scott in charge, expecting Scott to turn the company around. After teasing Abby about her first entrepreneurship being a dating app, Scott accepted Abby's challenge over whose project would be most profitable.

Sharon discovered a potential "sex slave" named Crystal, a young caller on the crisis intervention hotline. Crystal managed to escape her captors, and Nick found her hiding in the alley behind The Underground. He brought her inside, and Sharon managed to get out of her that she was afraid of being captured and returned. But when Sharon left the room, Crystal disappeared. Sharon went to Paul with the information and spoke to Scott about doing an exposé on it. But Christine was livid that Sharon had met the girl at a hotel room where Crystal had been dragged away by a beefy guy.

Nick and Sharon were shocked to recognize Alice Johnson sitting at The Underground bar, decked out in expensive clothes and looking great. She chatted with Sharon, telling her that she had landed a great job in sales and was just passing through. But Sharon was convinced that Alice had left in same car she had seen at the Night & Day Motel where the sex slave operation was going on. Luckily, Alice had left behind her credit card, and when she returned for it, Nick put a tracker on Alice's car. It led them to a lovely home in town where Alice apparently lived with the girls. Sharon and Nick shared with Scott and Tessa that they were convinced that Alice was working in the sex slave ring. Scott posed as a “John” and his “date” told him that Chrystal had been sent away. Tessa and Mariah Copeland kidnapped Alice and tricked her to get Crystal back, and Crystal was taken into protective custody. But Alice was then run down by a car, and disappeared from the hospital. Security footage showed her painfully walking out, headed for the taxi stand.

Zack joined Scott drinking at a bar and put something in Scott's beer. Scott awoke in a hotel room next to the dead body of Natalia, one of the sex ring girls. Scott called Victor for help, but instead Victor called the police. Paul broke into the hotel room, and Scott was held for questioning. Zack told the police that Natalia was afraid of Scott, that Scott left the bar drunk and took a cab to go clubbing. Scott realized that Zack had set him up. Out on bail, Scott confronted Zack with setting him up and running the sex ring. Zack denied it and prepared to leave town, but changed his mind, realizing he was in love with Abby. At a Newman party, Scott persuaded Crystal to publicly expose Zack as the leader of the sex ring, and that his dating app, funded by Newman Enterprises, was a front. Zack rushed Abby Newman down the elevator and fled. Scott followed them to a storage building outside of town. After failing to persuade Abby to run away with him, Zack shoved her and Scott inside, locked the door, and fled. As time passed, Scott experience PTSD. They dropped their usual barbed conversation, and Abby helped him work through it. Hugging him led to kissing, and they had sex. Afterwards they were both amazed at what had occurred and vowed to never speak of it again. They started digging through the records stored there and found an envelope of the girls’ travel visas, a list of properties Zack owned and his dummy corporations. Meanwhile, Jack and Victor pooled money to set up a ten million dollar reward for Abby's return, and Sharon went on the Hilary Hour expressing her concern for Scott and Abby. They ended up getting out the next day by starting a fire under the sprinkler system which alerted an attendant who let them out. Seeing Zack's car still there, Scott insisted on going to Zack's motel room. Zack walked in on them, first begged Abby to run away with him, then accused them of cheating on him. Zack, about to shoot them, was charged by Scott. Zack was shot in the back by Crystal who ran away, and Zack died.

Victoria Newman welcomed them home by shutting down Scott's Hashtag webzine, calling a press conference, and giving Abby a statement to read taking responsibility away from Newman for DesignDate and the sex ring, which made Abby look pathetic, inexperienced, and naïve. Abby and Scott edited the statement infuriating Victoria. Scott managed to get Hashtag back up and published the full story. Called to Victoria's office, Abby quit her job. Scott had planned to quit too, but because his Hashtag article was trending, Victoria gave Scott a raise and a bonus, and reinstated Hashtag. Abby felt double crossed again. When Victor found out, he refused Abby's resignation, told Victoria she was wrong and agreed with Abby that he would have resigned too. Abby agreed to return with stipulations that she report directly to Victor, get an office with theirs, and a bump in title and salary. Scott appeared on “New York Newstime Now” with Kerry Forrest and defended Newman. Afterward, Scott was elated to be offered a job as an on air reporter, but it meant moving to New York City so he declined.

Sharon and Scott declared their love, and Scott moved in. Meanwhile, Scott and Abby had a lot of awkward moments filled with sexual tension, and twice ended up in a kiss. Unfortunately, Faith saw them kissing and suddenly turned on Scott. Mariah got Faith to tell her what was wrong, and let Scott know he was out of line. Scott and Abby decided to avoid each other, but Victor kept putting them together on various projects. Mariah suggested he give Sharon an engagement ring for Christmas.

On New Year's Eve, after agreeing that their relationship would be business only, Nick Newman saw Scott and Abby kiss. Abby told Nick it was nothing, but Nick felt he had to tell Sharon. Sharon confronted Scott, who confessed that he had PTSD in the storage locker and that he and Abby had sex. Scott showed Sharon the engagement ring he had intended to give her New Year's Eve, but she ground it into the dirt with her heel and asked him to move out. Sharon ran into Abby at the club and caused a scene with accusations that turned into a cat fight. Abby had to get away and went to work in Paris. Scott followed and confessed that he had feelings for her too. Unhappy with Hashtag being part of Newman Enterprises, Scott hoped to buy it but Lauren refused to bankroll it. He assured Abby that he would be moving to New York or Europe for job to get out of her hair. Abby had an idea, called and convinced Victor to sell Hashtag to Scott and take payments from its profits. Scott thanked her, but she said she owed him for the sex ring story which had saved her career. Scott discussed relocating to London or Paris to work on a story about jewel-thief rings who target jet setters, and to go undercover, he needed a well-known jet setter like Abby on his arm.

In July 2018, Scott published an article about the disappearance of J.T. Hellstrom who had been investigating Newman Enterprises for global price-fixing, accusing Victor of getting rid of J.T. and bringing up old suspicions of various enemies who had disappeared.

References

External links
 Scotty Grainger profile - Soapcentral.com

The Young and the Restless characters
Television characters introduced in 1991
Male characters in television
Fictional writers